Yerkes is an unincorporated village in Upper Providence Township, Montgomery County, Pennsylvania, United States, just southwest of Collegeville.  Yerkes is at a former road crossing of the Perkiomen Creek.

References

Unincorporated communities in Montgomery County, Pennsylvania
Unincorporated communities in Pennsylvania